The 1994 Australian Touring Car Championship was an Australian motor racing competition for Touring Cars. The championship, which was sanctioned by the Confederation of Australian Motor Sport as an Australian Title, was the 35th Australian Touring Car Championship. Promoted as the Shell Australian Touring Car Championship, it was contested over 10 rounds between February and July 1994.

The championship was won by Mark Skaife driving a Gibson Motorsport Holden VP Commodore.

Pre-season
The Ford EB Falcon and Holden VP Commodore were both homologated with new aerodynamic packages, the Falcon gaining controversial protrusions from its front splitter.

Teams and drivers
The following drivers and teams competed in the 1994 Australian Touring Car Championship:

Movements
Peter Brock moved from Advantage Racing to the Holden Racing Team with his Mobil sponsorship replacing Wayne Gardner. Brock's win in Round 7 at Sydney's Eastern Creek Raceway was the HRT's first ever ATCC round win and the first factory Holden win since Brock won round 6 of the 1986 ATCC at Surfers Paradise in a Holden Dealer Team Holden VK Commodore.
LoGaMo Racing purchased a pair of Perkins Engineering built VP Commodores to replace its BMW M3s. It continued to race four cars with Tony Longhurst and Paul Morris also driving a pair of BMW 320is in the Australian Manufacturers' Championship.
Wayne Gardner purchased the assets of Bob Forbes Racing to form Wayne Gardner Racing with Neil Crompton moving as part of the deal. The deal included major sponsorship from Coca-Cola.

Arrivals / returnees
Pinnacle Motorsport entered the series purchasing Peter Brock's 1993 Advantage Racing VP Commodore with Greg Crick and Tony Scott sharing the driving.
Dick Johnson's son Steven made his ATCC debut driving a third Dick Johnson Racing EB Falcon at the final round at Oran Park.

Departures
With LoGaMo Racing scaling back to two cars, John Blanchard and Geoff Full did not return

Race calendar
The 1994 Australian Touring Car Championship was contested over 10 rounds. 1994 saw the last ATCC race at the tight, 1.94 km (1.20 mi) Amaroo Park circuit in Sydney.

Each round comprised Qualifying, the Peter Jackson Dash, which was contested by the six fastest drivers from Qualifying, and two feature races.

Points system

Rounds 1 to 4
 Three points were awarded to the fastest driver in Qualifying at each round
 Points were awarded on a 3–2–1 basis for the first three places in the Peter Jackson Dash at each round
 Points were awarded on a 20–16–14–12–10–8–6–4–2–1 basis for the first ten places in each of the two races at each round

Rounds 5 to 10
 No points were awarded to the fastest driver in Qualifying at each round
 Points were awarded on a 3–2–1 basis for the first three places in the Peter Jackson Dash at each round
 One bonus point was awarded for each position gained during the Peter Jackson Dash, but only to a driver finishing third or higher in the Dash
 Points were awarded on a 20–16–14–12–10–8–6–4–2–1 basis for the first ten places in each of the two races at each round

Championship standings

Privateers Cup
The Privateers Cup was won by Bob Jones.

See also
1994 Australian Touring Car season

References

External links
 Official V8 Supercar site
 1994 Racing Results Archive

Australian Touring Car Championship seasons
Touring Cars
1994 in V8 Supercars